The Fort Lauderdale Yankees, based in Fort Lauderdale, Florida, were an American Minor League Baseball franchise that existed from 1962 through 1992. The team was a member of the Florida State League (FSL) as an affiliate of the New York Yankees and won seven FSL championships during its 31 years of existence.

The team was formed when the Yankees moved their spring training base from St. Petersburg, Florida, to Fort Lauderdale Stadium after the  season. Its last championship team, in 1987, was managed by Buck Showalter and featured future Major Leaguers Jim Leyritz, Kevin Maas and Dave Eiland.

When the Yankees left Fort Lauderdale for their new spring training home in Tampa, Florida, in 1993, the parent club maintained its other High-A affiliate, the Prince William Yankees of the Carolina League, and left the FSL for one season — returning in 1994 with the Tampa Yankees. The Boston Red Sox transferred their Winter Haven club to Fort Lauderdale Stadium for 1993 as the Fort Lauderdale Red Sox.

When the spring training relationship with Winter Haven ended, Boston tried to move its FSL franchise to its new spring training stadium, Fort Myers' City of Palms Park, but the shift was blocked by the established Fort Myers Miracle, a Minnesota Twins FSL affiliate that played in nearby Hammond Stadium. While the Red Sox and the Miracle ownership tried to resolve the impasse, Boston needed a 1993 venue for its displaced Winter Haven franchise. Fort Lauderdale Stadium was available.

As events turned out, the Red Sox/Miracle territorial dispute never permitted Boston to place its FSL team in Fort Myers. The Red Sox' parent company, Fenway Sports Group, eventually owned and operated its own High Class A farm club, the Salem Red Sox, in the Carolina League.

The Red Sox' one year in Fort Lauderdale was an athletic and economic disappointment. The team, managed by DeMarlo Hale (later the Red Sox' bench coach), compiled the worst record in the FSL at 46–85 (.351),  games out of first place. It drew 28,000 fans, second last in the league and almost 73,000 fans fewer than the 1992 Fort Lauderdale Yankees team. (It still out-paced the 1992 Winter Haven Red Sox entry, which attracted only 16,000 fans in its lame-duck season). Of the 40-plus players who suited up for the Fort Lauderdale Red Sox, only Shayne Bennett, Alex Delgado, Peter Hoy, Ryan McGuire and Lou Merloni would see Major League service.

Fort Lauderdale has not been represented in the Florida State League since 1993. Although the Baltimore Orioles eventually replaced the Yankees as Fort Lauderdale's spring training tenants, they never placed an FSL franchise in the city.

The Ballpark

For the duration of their existence, the Yankees played their home games at Fort Lauderdale Stadium located at 1401 NW 55th Street. The stadium doubled as the spring training home of the parent New York Yankees. Fort Lauderdale Stadium was demolished in 2019.

Notable alumni

Hall of Fame Alumni
 Bobby Cox (1971, MGR) Inducted, 2014
 Rickey Henderson (1985) Inducted,  2009

Notable alumni
 Steve Balboni (1979)
 Jay Buhner (1985)
 Carl Everett (1992)
 Cesar Geronimo (1968) 
 Ron Guidry (1972, 1988) 1978 AL Cy Young Award
 LaMarr Hoyt (1975) 1983 AL Cy Young Award
 Scott McGregor (1972)
 Willie McGee (1978) 2 × NL Batting Champion (1985, 1990)
 Bobby Murcer (1985) 
 Buck Showalter (1977, 1987)
 Bob Tewksbury (1982)
 José Rijo (1983)
 Mariano Rivera (1992) 13 x AL All Star
 Deion Sanders (1988)
 Bernie Williams (1987)

Year-by-year record

References

External links
 Baseball Reference

Boston Red Sox minor league affiliates
New York Yankees minor league affiliates
Defunct Florida State League teams
Defunct baseball teams in Florida
Baseball teams established in 1962
Baseball teams disestablished in 1993
1962 establishments in Florida
1993 disestablishments in Florida
Sports in Fort Lauderdale, Florida